Zenón Díaz (31 December 1880 – 5 September 1948) was an Argentine footballer who played as a defender for Rosario Central, where he won four national cups.

Díaz was also an athlete, where he specialised in jumps and throws.

Club career 
Díaz started playing as goalkeeper for Rosario Central after he was discovered by two club executives, who had watched him playing in the streets. Those executives had been impressed by Díaz's ability in the use of hands. He debuted as goalkeeper in a match v Rosario A.C. in 1903, which Central lost 2–1. Nevertheless, Díaz did not remain much longer playing as goalkeeper because (in his own words) "I preferred to play in a position where I could run".

As a defender, Díaz consolidated as one of the most famous backs of his time. Díaz played for Rosario Central from 1903 to 1919, when he retired after a match v arch-rival Newell's Old Boys on 4 May. As a curious fact, Díaz played the last minutes as goalkeeper, replacing his nephew Octavio Díaz, who had left the field after being injured.

Díaz played around 150 games and scored eight goals, winning four national cups and seven regional titles with Rosario Central. Like most of players during amateur era, he also worked at the Central Argentine Railway. Díaz's playing style was based on a though mark, and his slide tackles became his most characteristic move on the field.

National team career 
With the Argentina national team, his debut was vs English club Nottingham Forest during their 1905 tour on South America. His last match with Argentina was in 1916 v Uruguay. Díaz was the first Argentine native (non-British origin) player to be capped for the national team.

His first match was in 1905 versus Nottingham Forest. Later he played in several cups against Uruguay, and participated in the first Copa América held in 1916.

Later years 

Díaz attended the celebration of the 50th. anniversary of Club Rosario Central held in 1939, being honored by the club as one of its most notable players. He was also the flag bearer during the ceremony. Díaz also participated in the radio program La Voz del Deporte ("the voice of sports") where he was part of a special edition to commemorate the 50th. anniversary.

Zenón Díaz died on 5 September 1948, after battling against a disease.

Honours 
Rosario Central
 Copa de Competencia La Nación (1): 1913
 Copa Ibarguren (1): 1915
 Copa de Competencia Jockey Club (1): 1916
 Copa Honor MCBA (1): 1916
 Copa Nicasio Vila (6): 1908, 1914, 1915, 1916, 1917, 1919
 Federación Rosarina de Football: 1913

Argentina
 Copa Lipton (1): 1906
 Copa Premier Honor Argentino (1): 1913
 Copa Newton (1): 1916
 Copa Premier Honor Uruguayo (1): 1916

References

1880 births
1948 deaths
Association football defenders
Association football goalkeepers
Rosario Central footballers
Argentine footballers
Argentina international footballers
Footballers from Córdoba, Argentina